This is a list of video games which can be played by multiple users on a singular device. This page is not about LAN Play.

Computer

Dreamcast

GameCube

Nintendo 64

Nintendo Switch

PlayStation

PlayStation 2

PlayStation 3

PlayStation 4

PlayStation 5

Super Nintendo Entertainment System

Wii

Wii U

Xbox

Xbox 360

Xbox One

Legend

See also
 List of Wii games
 List of GameCube games
 List of Wii games that use the Classic Controller
 List of Wii games that use the Nintendo GameCube controller

References

Local multiplayer